Oliver Batchelor (born 2 October 1996) is an English cricketer. He made his first-class debut on 26 March 2019, for Leeds/Bradford MCCU against Derbyshire, as part of the Marylebone Cricket Club University fixtures.

References

External links
 

1996 births
Living people
English cricketers
Leeds/Bradford MCCU cricketers
Place of birth missing (living people)